Parliamentary elections were held in Venezuela on 4 December 2005 to elect the 167 deputies to the National Assembly of Venezuela, twelve deputies to the Latin American Parliament and five deputies to the Andean Parliament. Several days prior to the elections, five opposition parties unexpectedly withdrew, shortly after a dispute over the voting process had apparently been resolved with the support of the Organization of American States (OAS). The opposition had been expected to get around a third of the Assembly seats, or even less; the withdrawal meant the opposition were scarcely represented in the parliament at all, as the opposition parties which did not withdraw failed to win any seats. 114 seats went to the President's Fifth Republic Movement (MVR) – up from 86, with the remaining 53 going to "smaller pro-Chávez parties as well as to independents and representatives of some social groups that support the government".

Both the Organization of American States (OAS) and the European Union sent delegations to observe the elections. In the runup to the election, there were concerns about the use of digital fingerprint scanners as part of the voting process. On 28 November the National Electoral Council (CNE), in a decision brokered by the OAS, announced that it would not use the controversial machines. Despite this, several days later five opposition parties withdrew from the elections. "In particular, the EU stated the CNE's decision to eliminate the digital fingerprint devices from the voting process was timely, effective, and constructive, and noted with surprise the opposition's withdrawal just four days before the election." The OAS criticized the withdrawal, saying that democracy requires an opposition committed to the electoral process.

Both the EU and the OAS noted a widespread distrust of the National Electoral Council. "The OAS delegation noted that there remains a distrust of the CNE on the part of a significant segment of the population in terms of the origin and composition of the CNE and the perception that its actions lack transparency and impartiality." The OAS recommended democratic discussion of various aspects of the electoral process to improve trust in the system.

The election proceeded largely without incident, although three small bombs were exploded in Caracas, injuring one police officer.

Campaign

Pre-election polls
"In the lead-up to the December 2005 election, observers predicted that the opposition would struggle to win one-third of the seats in the Assembly and that the pro-Chávez parties would win a two-thirds majority control of the legislature."

Electoral process audit
Just weeks before the elections, an audit was made in presence of the National Electoral Council (CNE), OAS international observers and several political parties. During the audit, the opposition started claiming that the electoral machines recorded the sequence of the votes, while fingerprint scanners recorded the information of each voter. However, though the fingerprint scanners were altogether not connected to and in different places than the voting machines, and the lines of voters at each of the machine groups were totally unrelated, the opposition put forward the case that it was possible to unscramble the information, stating that cross-matching the data between the two machines could potentially show the voting details of those who voted. The reconstruction of this data is considered possible by some characters, allegedly due to the requirement of access to the voting machines and knowledge of the password. As an extra measure of reassurance, the CNE agreed to format the data held on the voting machines as soon as these finished transmitting their precinct totals to the CNE. As long as every voting machine also printed its precinct totals, it was easy for all involved parties to check the validity of the data as reported in both instances, the printed precinct totals and the partial results reported in the CNE tallying center.

Both the Organization of American States (OAS) and the European Union sent delegations to observe the elections. On 28 November the National Electoral Council (CNE), in a decision brokered by the OAS, announced that it would not use the controversial machines. The CNE stood by its claim that the fingerprint scanners were not usable to identify the votes. The same devices had been used on the 2004 recall referendum, and the state governors' elections that same year.

Political parties' withdrawal
Despite the CNE concession on the use of fingerprint scanners, five opposition parties withdrew from the elections. "The move surprised election officials, and some reports indicate that international observers were unhappy that the opposition had reneged on a commitment to participate in the elections if the digital fingerprint machines were not used." "In particular, the EU stated the CNE's decision to eliminate the digital fingerprint devices from the voting process was timely, effective, and constructive, and noted with surprise the opposition's withdrawal just four days before the election." The OAS criticized the withdrawal, saying that democracy requires an opposition committed to the electoral process.

By the Friday before the elections, five opposition political parties had withdrawn from the election: Democratic Action (Acción Democrática), COPEI (Social Christian Party of Venezuela), Project Venezuela (Proyecto Venezuela), Justice First (Primero Justicia), and A New Era (Un Nuevo Tiempo). These political parties represented the majority of the opposition forces in the country. Vice President José Vicente Rangel declared that "they know that they are defeated because they too read the surveys and know that if they participate they will have a poor representation."  He also stated that the U.S. Department of State, through their embassy in Caracas, was responsible for the withdrawals. The New York Times noted that "The opposition decision appeared to be aimed at appealing to international support and discrediting Venezuela's government, which has strong approval ratings." José Miguel Vivanco, the Americas director of Human Rights Watch, was quoted as saying "It's really hard to understand what exactly the political opposition leadership has in mind. But certainly it is not going to help them to present themselves as victims that deserve solidarity from the international community. With these kinds of tactics I don't think they'll gain any ground."

The deadline for candidate withdrawal was Saturday, 3 December, at 4:00 pm. The CNE announced that not all of the boycotting political parties formally withdrew, meaning that only 10.08% of the candidates were officially out of the elections. The withdrawals left most opposition parties outside the election. Movement Towards Socialism (Movimiento al Socialismo), Red Flag Party (Partido Bandera Roja) and Democratic Left (Izquierda Democrática) did, however, participate in the election, but won no seats.

Results
The CNE announced preliminary results that showed that the pro-Chávez party Fifth Republic Movement won 114 out of 167 seats in the National Assembly, and all other seats were won by allied parties. The Fifth Republic Movement list also received 89% of the vote for the Latin American Parliament and the Andean Parliament. It is estimated that the turnout in the election was about 25% compared to 50 to 60% in previous parliamentary elections (1998 and 2000).<ref> El Universal, 4 December 2005, CNE ANUNCIA QUE LA PARTICIPACIÓN ALCANZÓ 25 POR CIENTO</ref>

Some suggested that these results were a very important issue in Venezuela, since a two-thirds majority in parliament is needed to change the constitution, and these elections gave the Fifth Republic Movement a sufficient majority to change the constitution with or without the support of other political parties.CNE, Cronograma 

The opposition and some international observers have made the claim that the abstention rate of about 75% demonstrates a deep distrust in the electoral process and the Chávez government, although in the context of the opposition withdrawal the abstention rate carries a different meaning than for a typical election, and previous poll ratings showed the opposition doing badly.

After the elections, divisions emerged over the last minute withdrawal from the elections. Primero Justicia activists in particular regretted missing the opportunity to be seen as the major opposition after the withdrawal of Democratic Action and COPEI.

References

External links
Con cerca del 70% de abstención, Chávez obtiene la victoria en las elecciones legislativas, Wikinoticias, 5 December 2005
La oposición se retira de las elecciones legislativas en Venezuela, Wikinoticias'', 3 December 2005
Mark Weisbrot (Center for Economic and Policy Research), Larry Birns (Council on Hemispheric Affairs): Open Letter to the Journalists Covering the Venezuelan Elections (1 December 2005)
 OAS section on the Venezuelan parliamentary elections, 2005

Venezuela
Elections in Venezuela
2005 in Venezuela
National Assembly (Venezuela)
Bolivarian Revolution
Election and referendum articles with incomplete results